Simone Gilges (born 1973, Bonn, West Germany) is a contemporary artist, founding member of Honey-Suckle Company, and publisher of freier - magazine for the mental state, who lives and works in Berlin.

Gilges studied Visual Communication at UdK Berlin University of the Arts, as well as Photography/Design at FH Dortmund. Her solo work has been exhibited widely internationally, including Galerie Giti Nourbakhsch, Berlin; Foxy Production, New York; Schirn Kunsthalle, Frankfurt; CAPC, Bordeaux; CRAC Alsace, France; pret a pARTager, Dakar, Senegal a.o.; Screen and Decor, Canada; Chelsea Art Museum, New York; Studio Voltaire, London; The John Institute, Zurich; Künstlerhaus Stuttgart; 4th Berlin Biennale, Gagosian Gallery, Hinterconti, Hamburg. Honey Suckle Company has been exhibited at  Frankfurter Kunstverein; Kunstverein Harburger Bahnhof, Hamburg; Kunsthalle Basel; Cubitt Gallery, London; Künstlerhaus Stuttgart; Sónar Festival, Barcelona; P.S.1 Contemporary Art Center, New York; Berlin Biennale 1

References

Further reading
 Galerie Giti Nourbakhsch 
 freier magazine
 Honey Suckle Company
Del Vecchio, Gigiotto in "Looking Back: Emerging Artists." Frieze, Issue 120, January–February 2009: 111.
Douglas, Sarah. "Liste: Quality Uneven but Spirits High". Artinfo.com, June 9, 2009.
Johnson, Paddy with Archey, Karen. "The AFC Liste Awards!", Art Fag City, June 12, 2009, artfagcity.com
Die Zeit: Dakar/Berlin, Mamadou Gomis und Simone Gilges

German contemporary artists
1973 births
Berlin University of the Arts alumni
Living people
21st-century German women artists
Artists from Bonn